Sir Robert Ernest Kelly   (7 April 1879 – 16 November 1944) was a British professor of surgery at the University of Liverpool.

He was a younger son of iron merchant Robert Kelly of Liverpool and educated at Liverpool Institute and University College, then part of Victoria University. He was amongst the first medical graduates of the newly formed University of Liverpool and was clinically trained at Liverpool Royal Infirmary, becoming house surgeon and surgeon, and then consulting surgeon.

During the first world war he served as consulting surgeon to the British Forces at Salonika with the temporary rank of colonel. In 1916 he was created CB for his services and afterwards served on the Army Council Medical Advisory Board.

He became part of the teaching staff of Liverpool University as lecturer in surgery and from 1922 to 1939 as professor of surgery. He was elected to the council of the Royal College of Surgeons in 1928, where he served for sixteen years, including acting as vice-president for 1938–40. He delivered the Bradshaw lecture in 1938 on "Recurrent peptic ulceration, causes of, and design for second operation on the stomach".

On his retirement he was granted the title of emeritus professor and created a Knight Bachelor in the 1939 Birthday Honours.

He died in Liverpool in 1944. He had married Averill Edith Irma, the daughter of James Edlington M'Dougall; their daughter was art historian Alison Kelly.

See also
Charles Scott Sherrington

References 

1879 births
1944 deaths
Medical doctors from Liverpool
English knights
English surgeons
Fellows of the Royal College of Surgeons
Companions of the Order of the Bath
Knights Bachelor